Zeynabad (also Romanized as Zīnabad) is a village in Kahshang Rural District, in the Central District of Birjand County, South Khorasan Province, Iran. At the 2016 census, its population was less than 3 families.

References 

Populated places in Birjand County